Chip is a computer and communications magazine published by  CHIP Holding (formerly Vogel Burda Holding GmbH) in several countries of Europe and Asia. The German edition of CHIP was launched in September 1978 and is one of Germany's oldest and largest computer magazines with 418,019 copies sold in average each month of the 4th quarter 2008.

Competitors in its German home market include Computer Bild, PC-Welt and c't.

CHIP Online
CHIP Online is the independent web portal of the CHIP brand. It is one of the most-visited media portals in the German language area, providing hardware and software tests and price comparisons, as well as a large downloading and a community portal. , it is a top 30 site in Germany according to Alexa traffic rankings. CHIP Online is operated by CHIP Digital GmbH.

Magazine 
Currently there are these German different magazines available:

 CHIP Plus
 CHIP Foto Video mit DVD
 CHIP Test & Kauf
 CHIP Linux

From 1998 to 2013, an Indian edition titled Intelligent Computing CHIP was published.

Statistics

Monthly magazine sales

Subscribers

References

External links
Chip.de
download.chip.eu/en
1978 establishments in West Germany
Computer magazines published in Germany
Monthly magazines published in Germany
Magazines established in 1978
Magazines published in Munich